The 1958 Virginia Cavaliers football team represented the University of Virginia during the 1958 NCAA University Division football season. The Cavaliers were led by first-year head coach Dick Voris and played their home games at Scott Stadium in Charlottesville, Virginia. They competed as members of the Atlantic Coast Conference, finishing in last place. Don Shula had his first coaching job with this team, serving as defensive backs coach. Virginia finished with a 1–9 record that year.

Schedule

References

Virginia
Virginia Cavaliers football seasons
Virginia Cavaliers football